Huang Jiaqiang (Chinese: 黄佳强; Pinyin: Huáng Jiāqiáng; born 14 March 1990) is a Chinese footballer who currently plays as a right-back for Nantong Zhiyun.

Club career
Huang started his professional football career in 2008 when he was loaned to China League Two side Guangdong Sunray Cave from Guangzhou Pharmaceutical for two years. On 10 May 2009, he scored his first senior goal in a league match which Guangdong beat Liaoning Whowin 2–1. His goal came in the 27th minute which was just one minute after he was substituted in. He returned to Guangzhou Pharmaceutical in December 2009 but was eventually loaned back to Guangdong Sunray Cave for another season in March 2010.

In the 2011 league season, Huang mostly played for the Guangzhou Evergrande reserve team. On 18 July 2012, he made his debut for Guangzhou Evergrande in a 2012 Chinese FA Cup match which Guangzhou beat Henan Jianye 2–1, coming on as a substitute for Zhang Hongnan in the second half. His first Chinese Super League debut came on 4 August 2012 in a 2–1 away defeat against Guizhou Renhe when he came on as a substitute for Zheng Zhi in the 81st minute. While he was part of the squad that won the 2013 Chinese Super League title he would join third tier club Jiangxi Liansheng the following season.

At Jiangxi he would go on to establish himself as a member of the team that went on to win the division title and promotion at the end of the 2014 China League Two campaign. Unfortunately he could not help the club avoid relegation in the 2015 China League One campaign. After four seasons at the club he joined third tier club Sichuan Longfor and was part of the team that gained promotion and won the 2018 China League One campaign. While he helped aid the club avoid relegation in the following campaign, the club was dissolved at the end of the season due to financial difficulties. Huang would be free to join second tier club Nantong Zhiyun, where he would establish himself within the team and was part of the squad as they gained promotion to the top tier at the end of the 2022 China League One season.

Career statistics 
Statistics accurate as of match played 31 December 2022.

Honours

Club
Guangzhou Evergrande
Chinese Super League: 2011, 2012, 2013
Chinese FA Super Cup: 2012
Chinese FA Cup: 2012
AFC Champions League: 2013

Jiangxi Liansheng
 China League Two: 2014

Sichuan Longfor
 China League Two: 2018

References

External links

1990 births
Living people
Footballers from Guangzhou
Chinese footballers
Guangdong Sunray Cave players
Guangzhou F.C. players
Jiangxi Beidamen F.C. players
Sichuan Longfor F.C. players
Nantong Zhiyun F.C. players
Chinese Super League players
China League One players
China League Two players
Association football defenders